The Fighting Parson may refer to:

People
James Caldwell, American Presbyterian minister and supporter of the American Revolution
John M. Chivington, American Methodist pastor who served as colonel in the United States Volunteers during the Colorado War and the New Mexico Campaigns of the American Civil War
Fountain E. Pitts, American Methodist pastor, Confederate chaplain and colonel in the American Civil War
Joseph Roby, American Congregationalist minister and supporter of the American Revolution
Pleasant Tackitt, American politician, pioneer Methodist minister, stockman, teacher, farmer, Indian fighter and Confederate Officer
Frederick Wedge, American boxer and clergyman

Films
The Fighting Parson, a 1930 film starring Harry Langdon
The Fighting Parson, a 1933 film starring Hoot Gibson

Theater
The Fighting Parson, a play by Marty Gervais based on the life of J O L Spracklin

Sports teams
A former nicknamed used by University of Denver athletic teams